Suyab (Middle Chinese: /suʌiH jiᴇp̚/), also known as Ordukent (modern-day Ak-Beshim), was an ancient Silk Road city located some 50 km east from Bishkek, and 8 km west southwest from Tokmok, in the Chu river valley, present-day Kyrgyzstan. The ruins of this city, along with other acheological sites associated with the Silk Road, was inscribed in 2014 on the UNESCO World Heritage List as the Silk Roads: the Routes Network of Chang'an-Tianshan Corridor World Heritage Site.

History 
The settlement of Sogdian merchants sprang up along the Silk Road in the 5th or 6th centuries. The name of the city derives from that of the Suyab River,
whose origin is Iranian (in Persian: suy means "toward"+ ab for "water", "rivers"). It was first recorded by Chinese pilgrim Xuanzang who traveled in the area in 629:

Traveling 500 li to the north west of Great Qing Lake, we arrive at the city of the Suye River. The city is 6 or 7 li in circuit; various Hu ("barbarian") merchants here came from surrounding nations congregate and dwell. The soil is favorable for red millet and for grapes; the woods are not thick, the climate is windy and cold; the people wear garments of twilled wool. Traveling from Suye westward, there are a great number of isolated towns; in each there is a chieftain; these are not dependent on one another, but all are in submission to the Tujue.

During the reign of Tong Yabgu Qaghan, Suyab was the principal capital of the Western Turkic Khaganate. The khagan also had a summer capital in Navekat near the springs north of Tashkent in the Talas Valley, the capitals are being noted as the westernmost capital of Western Turkic Khaganate. There was a sort of symbiosis, with the Sogdians responsible for economical prosperity and the Gokturks in charge of the city's military security.

Following the downfall of the khaganate, Suyab was absorbed into the Tang dynasty, of which it was a western military outpost between 648 and 719. A Chinese fortress was built there in 679, and Buddhism flourished. According to some accounts, the great poet Li Bai (Li Po) was born in Suyab. The Chinese traveler Du Huan, who visited Suyab in 751, found among the ruins a still-functioning Buddhist monastery, where Princess Jiaohe, daughter of Ashina Huaidao, used to dwell.

Suyab was one of the Four Garrisons of Anxi Protectorate until 719, when it was handed over to Sulu Khagan of the Turgesh, appointed by the Tang court as the "Loyal and Obedient Qaghan". After Sulu's murder in 738, the town was promptly retaken by Tang Chinese forces, along with Talas. The fort was strategically important during the wars between the Tang dynasty and the Tibetan Empire. In 766, the city fell to a Qarluq ruler, allied with the nascent Uyghur Khaganate.

Of the subsequent history of Suyab there is little record, especially after the Chinese evacuated the Four Garrisons in 787. David Nicolle states that Suyab provided 80,000 warriors for the Qarluq army and that it was governed by a man known as "King of Heroes". Hudud al-Alam, completed in 983, lists Suyab as a city of 20,000 inhabitants. It is believed to have been supplanted by Balasagun in the early 11th century and was abandoned soon thereafter.

The area around Suyab briefly returned to China under the Qing dynasty during the 18th century, but was ceded to the Russian Empire in the Treaty of Tarbagatai in 1864, along with Lake Balkhash. It became part of the Russian Empire's Semirechye Oblast; following the completion of national delimitation in Soviet Central Asia in 1936, Suyab was assigned into the Kyrgyz Soviet Socialist Republic.

Archaeological site 

In the 19th century the ruins at Ak-Beshim were erroneously identified with Balasagun, the capital of the Kara-Khitans. Wilhelm Barthold, who visited the site in 1893–94, also lent his support to this identification. Although excavations started in 1938, it was not until the 1950s that it was determined that the site had been abandoned as early as the 11th century and therefore would not be identical with Balasagun, which had flourished until the 14th century.

The archaeological site of Suyab covers some 30 hectares. As a testimony to Suyab's diverse and vibrant culture, the site encompasses remains of Chinese fortifications, Nestorian Christian churches, Zoroastrian ossuaries, and Turkic balbals. The site is particularly rich in finds of Buddha statues and stelae. Apart from several Buddhist temples, there were a Nestorian church and cemetery from the 7th century, and probably also a 10th-century monastery with frescoes and inscriptions in Sogdian and Uyghur scripts.

See also
 Navekat

References

Citations

Sources 
 Cui, Mingde (2005). The History of Chinese Heqin. Beijing: People's Press. .   
 Nicolle, David (1990). Attila and the Nomad Hordes. Osprey Publishing. .   
 Ji, Xianlin(1985). Journey to the West in the Great Tang Dynasty. Xi'an: Shaanxi People's Press.   
 Xue, Zongzheng (1998). Anxi and Beiting Protectorates: A Research on Frontier Policy in Tang Dynasty's Western Boundary. Harbin: Heilongjiang Education Press. .   
 Xue, Zongzheng (1992). A History of Turks. Beijing: Chinese Social Sciences Press. .

External links
Суяб или городище Ак-Бешим ("Suyab, or the fortified settlement Ak-Beshim") 

Archaeological sites in Kyrgyzstan
History of the Turkic peoples
Populated places along the Silk Road
Populated places established in the 6th century
Chüy Region
Former populated places in Kyrgyzstan
Sogdian cities